Ligon is a ghost town in Bartow County, in the U.S. state of Georgia.

History
A post office called Ligon was established in 1888, and remained in operation until it was discontinued in 1902. The community was named for James Oliver Ligon, a settler.

References

Geography of Bartow County, Georgia
Ghost towns in Georgia (U.S. state)